People of Earth is a 2016 American comedy television series.

People of Earth may also refer to:
"People of Earth", a reference to humans
People of Earth, a 2007 album by Doctor Steel
People of Earth, an episode of Star Trek: Discovery

See also
People of the Earth, a 1992 novel by W. Michael Gear and Kathleen O'Neal Gear in the First North Americans series.
Citizens of Earth, a 2015 video game